The Ji River usually refers to the former major river of Shandong, China, effectively destroyed during the 1852 Yellow River flood.

It may also refer to:

 Ji River (姬水, Jī Shuǐ) in Chinese legend, usually identified with the Fen River in Shanxi, China

See also
 Jishui River